Skerries railway station (Irish: Stáisiún na Sceirí) serves Skerries in County Dublin, Ireland.

History
The station opened on 25 May 1844.

Description 

The station has two platforms for the lines that run through the station. There is a footbridge connecting the platforms. An underpass was open, but was closed permanently on Wednesday 31 August 2016. Platform 1 runs mostly south, while platform 2 runs mostly north. The middle of the footbridge is 1 mile from the Martello tower on Red Island and 8 km from Rockabill lighthouse

Services 

The commuter train is the only train that stops at the station. The fleet class is the IE 29000 DMU. The only other trains that pass the station are the Dublin to Belfast Enterprise train, the Tara Mine zinc ore freight train led by IE 071 class trains, and an out of service transfer intercity train, which use IE 22000 DMU class trains.

Proposed expansion 
As part of Project Ireland 2040 the DART is proposed to be extended to Drogheda on the Northern Line serving Donabate, Rush & Lusk, Skerries, Balbriggan and on to Drogheda.

See also
 List of railway stations in Ireland

References

External links 

 Irish Rail Skerries Station Website
 Eiretrains - Skerries Station

Iarnród Éireann stations in Fingal
Railway stations opened in 1844
Railway stations in Fingal
Railway stations in the Republic of Ireland opened in 1844